Space Waltz were a New Zealand glam rock band formed in 1974 by frontman Alastair Riddell. In 1974, they had a number-one hit in New Zealand with "Out on the Street".

Background
In 1974, the group's image created a bit of a stir when they appeared on Studio One's New Faces. They went into the finals but were unsuccessful. However they were a hit with the rock fans. They were noticed by EMI and the label promptly signed up.

Space Waltz won Best New Artist at the 1975 Recording Arts Talent Awards.

In March 2021, original member Eddie Rayner announced on RNZ that Space Waltz was in the process of recording a new album, to be released in the end of 2021.

Singles
Their 1974 single "Out on the Street" sold well in New Zealand and subsequently went to number 1 there.

Albums
The musicians on the 1974 EMI-released Space Waltz album were Riddell, Rayner, Greg Clark, Peter Cuddihy, Brent Eccles, and The Yandall Sisters.

Discography

References

External Links
AudioCulture profile

1970s in New Zealand music
New Zealand glam rock musical groups
EMI Records artists
Musical groups from Auckland
Musical groups established in 1974